The nematode worm Caenorhabditis elegans was first studied in the laboratory by Victor Nigon and Ellsworth Dougherty in the 1940s, but came to prominence after being adopted by Sydney Brenner in 1963 as a model organism for the study of developmental biology using genetics. In 1974, Brenner published the results of his first genetic screen, which isolated hundreds of mutants with morphological and functional phenotypes, such as being uncoordinated. In the 1980s, John Sulston and co-workers identified the lineage of all 959 cells in the adult hermaphrodite, the first genes were cloned, and the physical map began to be constructed. In 1998, the worm became the first multi-cellular organism to have its genome sequenced.
Notable research using C. elegans includes the discoveries of caspases, RNA interference, and microRNAs. Six scientists have won the Nobel prize for their work on C. elegans.

Early research 
C. elegans was first described in 1900 by Émile Maupas, who isolated it from soil in Algeria. Ellsworth Dougherty proposed in 1948 that free-living nematodes of the sub-order Rhabditina might be useful for genetic study, noting their relative structural simplicity and invariant cell lineage (eutely). Dougherty and Victor Nigon obtained the first mutant, from a laboratory culture of the closely related nematode Caenorhabditis briggsae. However much of the early laboratory work on Caenorhabditis nematodes was directed towards the establishment of a defined axenic culture medium.

Brenner's search for a new model system 
By the early 1960s, Sydney Brenner had made several important contributions to molecular biology, notably a demonstration (with Francis Crick and other colleagues) that the genetic code is triplet in nature.
In June 1963, he wrote to Max Perutz, then the head of the MRC Laboratory of Molecular Biology, Cambridge, proposing future research:

By the end of that year, his thoughts were more concrete:

Brenner obtained C. elegans from Dougherty and began to study them in the laboratory by December 1963.

Transgenesis
C. elegans is amenable to transgenesis, the process of introducing foreign genetic material into the genome.  The most frequent method for generating transgenic worms is to inject exogenous DNA into the syncytial germ line; biolistic transformation can also be used.

See also 
History of model organisms

References 

Caenohabditis elegans
Caenorhabditis elegans